Following is a list of notable Albanian painters & sculptors.

Classical 
 Onufri (16th Century)
 Kostandin Shpataraku (1736–1767)
 David Selenica (18th Century)
 Marco Basaiti (1470–1530)
 Andrea Aleksi (1425–1505)
 Zografi Brothers (18th Century)

Modern 
Mustafa Arapi (born 1950)
Lumturi Blloshmi (1944-2020)
Xhovalin Delia (born 1959)
Parid Dule (born 1969)
Helidon Gjergji (born 1970)
Ervin Hatibi (born 1974)
Fatmir Haxhiu (1927–2001)
Kolë Idromeno (1860–1939)
Sadik Kaceli (1912–2000)
Ibrahim Kodra (1918–2006)
Zef Kolombi (1907–1949)
Abidin Dino (1913–1993)
Andrea Kushi (1884–1959)
Gazmend Leka (born 1953)
Ndoc Martini (1880–1916)
Agathangjel Mbrica (1883–1957)
Toni Milaqi (born 1974)
Vangjush Mio (1891–1957)
Genc Mulliqi (born 1966)
Fatmir Musaj (born 1958)
George Pali (born 1957)
Edi Rama (born 1964)
Chatin Sarachi (1899–1974)
Zef Shoshi (born 1939)
Saimir Strati (born 1966)
Eltjon Valle (born 1984)
Shaqir Veseli (born 1957)
Ilia Xhokaxhi (1948–2007)
Agim Zajmi (1936–2013)
Agim Kadillari (born 1953)
Qemal Butka (1907–1997)
Musa Qarri (born 1953)
Nexhmedin Zajmi (1916–1991)
Miranda Kalefi (born 1963)
Ilir Jaçellari (born 1970)
Spiro Xega (1861–1953)
Agim Sulaj (born 1960)
Arthur Tashko (1901–1994)
Lui Shtini (born 1978) 
Engjëll Berisha (1926–2010)
Masar Caka (1946–2000)
Tahir Emra (born 1938)
Abdullah Gërguri (1931–1994)
Nimon Lokaj (born 1941)
Ramadan Ramadani (1944–2005)
Esat Valla (born 1944)
Muslim Mulliqi (1934–1998)
Abdurrahim Buza (1905–1987)
Omer Kaleshi (1932–2022)
Sadri Ahmeti (1939–2010)
Maks Velo (1935–2020)

See also
 Albanian art
 List of Albanians

References

Painters
Albanians